Feyzi (Persian: فیضی) is a Turkish-language masculine given name and Persian-language surname derived from the Persian noun of Arabic origin فیض (fayz) with the meaning "grace".
Notable people with the name include:

Given name 
 Feyzi Mengüç (1894–1983), Ottoman military person
 Aziz Feyzi Pirinççizâde (1878–1933), Kurdish politician in the Ottoman Empire
 Feyzi Ahsen Böre (1917–1975), Turkish ice hockey player

Surname 
 Mohammad Feyzi (born 1981), Iranian academic and reformist politician
 Yaser Feyzi (born 1992), Iranian footballer

Turkish masculine given names
Persian-language surnames